Sharifabad (also Romanized as Sharīfābād; also known as Eshkambarābād, Shekambarābād, Ishtambarābād, and Shekambor Abad) is a village in Alqurat Rural District, in the Central District of Birjand County, South Khorasan Province, Iran. At the 2006 census, its population was 149, in 42 families.

References 

Populated places in Birjand County